The Suffolk Journal is the undergraduate student newspaper of Suffolk University. It has operated continuously since 1936.  The Journal prints a 16-page weekly newspaper, distributed across campus.

The Journal is currently located in the Sawyer building on Ashburton Place close to the Massachusetts State House. Previously, the office was located on the fifth floor of the Donahue building on Temple Street. Students across different majors help to put the paper together every week. Students are encouraged to send in their articles or opinion pieces.

Managed and produced entirely by undergraduate students, providing news coverage, both on and off campus, entertainment and sports stories, editorials and reviews.

There are five sections of the paper: News, World News, Arts & Culture, Opinion and Sports.

Due to the COVID-19 pandemic, in 2020 The Suffolk Journal started The Suffolk Journal Newsletter.

2021–2022 editorial board
source:

Editor-in-chief: Caroline Enos '22
Managing editor: Emily Devlin '22
Copy editor: Morgan Torre '23
Copy editor: Grace MacDonald '24
Assistant copy editor: Ashley Fairchild '22
News editor: Katelyn Norwood '22
Assistant news editor: Shealagh Sullivan '24
Assistant news editor: William Woodring '24
World news editor: Olivia Acevedo '22
Assistant world news editor: Grace Dreher '24
Arts & culture editor: Sarah Lukowski '22
Assistant arts & culture editor: Abby O'Connor '23
Assistant arts & culture editor: Emily Beatty '22
Opinion editor: Nick Milano '23
Assistant opinion editor: N/A
Sports editor: JD Conte '23
Sports editor: Nick Frieburger '22
Photo editor: Leo Woods '24
Multimedia editor: James Bartlett '23
Web editor: Jamie Taris '24
Graphics editor: Julia Fusco '23
Business manager: Melissa Aguilera '22
Social media manager: Alexa DiFiore '23
Assistant social media manager: Val Watson
Meteorologist and staff writer: Jacob Murphy '22
Cartoonist and staff writer: Hunter Berube '22

References

Sources
 
 

 

Journal
Student newspapers published in Massachusetts
Newspapers published in Boston
Weekly newspapers published in the United States
Publications established in 1936